Jerusalmi is a surname. Notable people with the surname include:

Myriam Fox-Jerusalmi (born 1961), French slalom canoeist 
Raffaele Jerusalmi (born 1961), Italian business executive